Csézy, real name Erzsébet Csézi (born 9 October 1979 in Mezőkövesd), is a Hungarian pop singer. On 8 February 2008 she was chosen to represent Hungary at the Eurovision Song Contest in Belgrade with the song "Candlelight". She finished last in the second semi-final on 22 May with six points.

Discography

Albums

See also
 Hungarian pop
 Hungary in the Eurovision Song Contest 2008

External links

  
 

1979 births
Living people
Eurovision Song Contest entrants of 2008
Eurovision Song Contest entrants for Hungary
21st-century Hungarian women singers
Hungarian pop singers
People from Mezőkövesd